Yohan Brouckaert (born 30 October 1987) is a Belgian footballer who plays for Mandel United.

References

External links
 Yohan Brouckaert on Eurofotbal

1987 births
Living people
Belgian footballers
Belgian Pro League players
Challenger Pro League players
Royal Excel Mouscron players
A.F.C. Tubize players
K.V. Oostende players
Oud-Heverlee Leuven players
K.S.V. Roeselare players
Association football midfielders
Royal FC Mandel United players
RWDM47 players
People from Mouscron
Footballers from Hainaut (province)